Kathryn Smith (born ) is an American football coach who most recently served as the special teams quality control coach for the Buffalo Bills. She was the first full-time female coach in NFL history. Smith was also the only woman to ever hold a full-time coaching position in the NFL until the San Francisco 49ers hired Katie Sowers in 2017.

Early life
Smith grew up in DeWitt, New York, a suburb of Syracuse, and attended the Christian Brothers Academy. At CBA she participated in lacrosse, swimming, and bowling. After graduating from CBA in 2003 she went to St. John's University in New York City. Smith majored in Sport Management and served as a student manager of the men's basketball team. Smith graduated from St. John's in 2007.

Career 
Smith began interning for the New York Jets while attending St. John's, becoming a game-day/special events intern in 2003 and then a college scouting intern in 2005. She became a player personnel assistant in 2007. She then became an administrative assistant in 2014 and joined the Bills as an administrative assistant in 2015. The Bills promoted her to special teams quality control coach on January 20, 2016, replacing Michael Hamlin. She was the first woman to be a full-time coach in the NFL. After the dismissal of Rex Ryan, Smith was not retained by new coach Sean McDermott heading into the 2017 season.

See also
Jennifer Welter
Sarah Thomas (American football official)

References

External links
 Bills Coach profile

American sportswomen
Buffalo Bills coaches
Living people
People from DeWitt, New York
Place of birth missing (living people)
St. John's University (New York City) alumni
1980s births
Female sports coaches
21st-century American women
Female coaches of American football